Thelonious in Action: Recorded at the Five Spot Cafe is a 1958 album by jazz musician Thelonious Monk with Johnny Griffin. The album was recorded live at the Five Spot Café on August 7, 1958, at the same sessions that produced Misterioso.  It featured the debuts of Monk's compositions "Light Blue" and "Coming on the Hudson".

Track listing 
Side One
 "Light Blue" – 5:14
 "Coming on the Hudson" – 5:24
 "Rhythm-A-Ning" – 9:25
 "Epistrophy (Theme)" – 1:05

Side Two
 "Blue Monk" - 8:31
 "Evidence" – 8:48
 "Epistrophy (Theme)" – 1:05

CD Bonus Tracks
 "Unidentified Solo Piano" – 1:54*
 "Blues Five Spot" – 9:56*
 "In Walked Bud / Epistrophy (Theme)" – 10:57*

* CD bonus tracks were recorded on July 9, 1958

Personnel 
 Thelonious Monk – piano
 Johnny Griffin – tenor saxophone
 Ahmed Abdul-Malik – bass
 Roy Haynes – drums
  Orrin Keepnews – producer
  Ray Fowler – engineer
  Shigeo Miyamoto – mastering
  Paul Bacon – cover design

References

Albums produced by Orrin Keepnews
Albums with cover art by Paul Bacon
Thelonious Monk live albums
1958 live albums
Riverside Records live albums
Original Jazz Classics albums
Albums recorded at the Five Spot Café